Cecilio Acosta Miranda (born November 22, 1946) is a Mexican retired relief pitcher in Major League Baseball who played four seasons for the Chicago White Sox and Philadelphia Phillies.

Acosta became the first American League pitcher to make a plate appearance after the introduction of the designated hitter rule in 1973.

References

External links 

Cy Acosta at SABR (Baseball BioProject)
Cy Acosta at Baseball Almanac

1946 births
Living people
Alacranes de Campeche players
Algodoneros de Unión Laguna players
Angeles de Puebla players
Azules de Coatzacoalcos players
Baseball players from Sinaloa
Charros de Jalisco players
Charros de Orizaba players
Chicago White Sox players
Iowa Oaks players
Major League Baseball pitchers
Major League Baseball players from Mexico
Mexican Baseball Hall of Fame inductees
Mexican expatriate baseball players in the United States
Mexican League baseball pitchers
Mineros de Fresnillo players
Pericos de Puebla players
Petroleros de Poza Rica players
Philadelphia Phillies players
Porteños de Puerto México players
Rieleros de Aguascalientes players
Tomateros de Culiacán players
Tucson Toros players
Yaquis de Obregón players